
Restaurant Gravin van Buren is a defunct restaurant in Buren, in the Netherlands. It was a fine dining restaurant that was awarded one Michelin star in 1986 and retained that rating until 1995.

Owner and head chef was Austrian Walter Bloier.

Gravin van Buren is a former member of the Alliance Gastronomique Néerlandaise. Bloier changed course with his restaurant in 2007 and therefore ended the membership.

In 2011, Bloier closed down the restaurant and retired.

See also
List of Michelin starred restaurants in the Netherlands

References 

Restaurants in the Netherlands
Michelin Guide starred restaurants in the Netherlands
Defunct restaurants in the Netherlands
Restaurants in Gelderland
Buren